The following is a list of transfers for the 2009 Major League Soccer season.  Seattle Sounders FC, a new expansion team, signed four players during the 2008 season, however their transfers are listed on this page for clarity. David Beckham's loan to Milan was also made during the 2008 season.  The rest of the transfers were made during the 2008–09 offseason all the way through to the MLS transfer deadline on August 31, 2009.

Transfers

Notes and references

External links
 Official Site of Major League Soccer

2009

Major League Soccer
Major League Soccer